Kemp Rock is a large insular rock between Foyn Island and Bull Island in the Possession Islands of Antarctica. It was mapped by the United States Geological Survey from surveys and U.S. Navy air photos, 1960–63, and was named by the Advisory Committee on Antarctic Names for William R. Kemp, U.S. Navy, Photographer of Squadron VX-6 on the flight of January 18, 1958, at the time the Possession Islands and this feature were photographed.

References

Rock formations of Victoria Land
Borchgrevink Coast